Philpot's and Hook Quarries is a  geological Site of Special Scientific Interest south-west of Sharpthorne in West Sussex. It is a Geological Conservation Review site.

These quarries expose the Ardingly Sandstone Member in the Tunbridge Wells Sand Formation, which is part of the Wealden Group, dating to the Lower Cretaceous between 140 and 100 million years ago. Philpot's Quarry has many dinosaur fossils and both quarries have debris dating to the Precambrian.

The quarries are private land with no public access.

References

Sites of Special Scientific Interest in West Sussex
Geological Conservation Review sites